Mark Edward Green (born November 8, 1964) is an American politician, physician, and retired U.S. Army major who has served as the U.S. representative for  since 2019. A member of the Republican Party, Green has chaired the Committee on Homeland Security since 2023. Before his election to Congress, he served in the Tennessee Senate from 2013 to 2018, representing the 22nd district.

After graduating from West Point, Green was an infantry officer. He then graduated from Boonshoft School of Medicine at Wright State University and became a flight surgeon, serving tours of duty in the War in Afghanistan and Iraq War. He wrote a book about his experience in Operation Red Dawn, in which Saddam Hussein was captured. After retiring from the military in 2006, Green became the CEO of a hospital emergency department staffing company.

Green first entered state politics in 2012 by defeating Democratic incumbent Tim Barnes for a seat in the Tennessee Senate. In 2017, President Donald Trump nominated Green to serve as the United States Secretary of the Army, but withdrew his nomination when comments Green had previously made came to light. When U.S. Representative Marsha Blackburn announced her candidacy for the United States Senate in 2018, Green announced his candidacy to succeed her. He was elected in November 2018.

Military career
In 1986, Green graduated from the United States Military Academy, where he earned a Bachelor of Science in quantitative business management. In 1987 he earned a master’s degree in systems management from the  University of Southern California. From 1987 to 1990, Green served as an infantry officer in the United States Army. His first duty assignment after graduation from the US Army Ranger School was with the 194th Armored Brigade at Fort Knox. There he served as a rifle platoon leader, scout platoon leader, and battalion adjutant for an infantry battalion. After the Infantry Officer's Advance Course, then-Captain Green served with the 82nd Airborne Division as an airborne battalion supply officer and rifle company commander.

Following a traumatic event in which a team of surgeons and critical care doctors saved his father's life, Green requested that the Army send him to medical school. He attended the Boonshoft School of Medicine at Wright State University, graduating with a Doctor of Medicine in 1999. He did his residency in emergency medicine at Fort Hood, Texas. After his residency, Green was selected to serve as the flight surgeon for the 160th Special Operations Aviation Regiment.

As a special operations flight surgeon, Green served a tour of duty in the Afghanistan War and two tours of duty in the Iraq War. He was the special operations flight surgeon during Operation Red Dawn, the military operation that captured Saddam Hussein. Green interrogated Hussein for six hours. After his military service, he authored a book, A Night With Saddam, detailing the capture and interrogation of Hussein and his service with the Army's elite aviation unit. Green was honorably discharged from the Army in 2006.

For his service, Green was awarded the Bronze Star, the Meritorious Service Medal with two oak leaf clusters, the Army Commendation Medal with two oak leaf clusters, the Achievement Medal with three oak leaf clusters, the Air Medal with the V Device for valor under heavy enemy fire while rescuing British Special Operations forces wounded near Fallujah, and the Combat Medical Badge, among other awards. He also earned the Air Assault Badge and the Flight Surgeon Badge during his service.

Civilian career
Green founded and served as chief executive officer of Align MD, a hospital emergency department management staffing company. Align MD provides staffing to emergency departments and hospital services in 50 hospitals in 10 states. Green also founded Two Rivers Medical Foundation, which provides health care to underserved populations worldwide via medical mission trips, and operates a free medical clinic in his hometown and in Memphis, Tennessee.

Green served on the boards of several for-profit companies, including American Physician Partners, Align MD, and Rural Physician Partners. Green is also a board member of the Middle Tennessee Boy Scouts of America. He has served on the advisory board of the political organization Latinos for Tennessee since 2015.

In 2015, Williamson College awarded Green an honorary Doctorate of Humanities.

Political career

Tennessee State Senate
Green was first elected to the Tennessee Senate in 2012, defeating Democratic incumbent Tim Barnes. He was rumored to be considering a challenge to Lamar Alexander in the 2014 U.S. Senate election, but declined to do so.

Green is most noteworthy for his legislation ending Tennessee's Hall Income Tax, only the second time in US history a state has repealed an income tax. He also co-sponsored a bill that eliminated the statute of limitations on rape cases where the DNA profile of the suspect is known. Green received awards recognizing his many laws protecting veterans and small businesses. He led the charge in Tennessee for automated technology in auto manufacturing, speaking at national conferences on the topic.

In 2015, Green proposed a pilot program to test an innovative solution to health care. The idea was to give Medicaid patients a reduced amount of health care dollars on a swipe card, giving them choice and control. The incentive is that any dollars not spent go to the patient as an addition to their earned income check. SJR 88 passed and was signed by the governor. The request for a waiver to test the program is at CMS for approval.

Green won the 2016 Republican primary 84% to 16% over Lori Smith of Clarksville, Tennessee. In the general election, he defeated Democratic nominee David Cutting, 67% to 33%.

Nomination as U.S. Army Secretary
In April 2017, President Donald Trump nominated Green for United States Secretary of the Army. Green was Trump's second nominee for this position after his first nominee, Vincent Viola, withdrew from consideration.

Green drew some opposition based on public comments about transgender people. At a September 2016 Tea Party gathering in Chattanooga, Tennessee, Green said, "If you polled the psychiatrists, they're going to tell you that transgender is a disease." He also supported a state law that limited access to public restrooms for transgender people to those matching their legal sex, not their gender identity, and told internet radio talk show host CJ Porter that he viewed his support of that law as part of his duty as a state senator to "crush evil".

Green also said that if school districts "want to have a bathroom that's separate for all of the, you know, guys or gals with question marks" but were concerned the "AFL-CIO is going to sue you, well, I got your back." It is assumed Green meant the American Civil Liberties Union (ACLU), not the American Federation of Labor and Congress of Industrial Organizations (AFL–CIO). Green also said that he would "not tolerate" students learning about Muslim beliefs and practices. Green added later that he doesn't "think we should teach the Lord’s Prayer" in schools either. In a call for separation of church and state, he said, "Leave that to the churches, the synagogues, and the mosques."

Green withdrew his nomination on May 5, 2017.

2018 Tennessee gubernatorial election

On January 4, 2017, Green filed paperwork to run for governor in the 2018 gubernatorial election. But in late 2017, when 7th District Representative Marsha Blackburn announced her candidacy for the United States Senate, Green announced he was running for the open congressional seat. His state senate district included almost all of the northeastern part of the congressional district.

U.S. House of Representatives

Elections

2018 

Green became the Republican nominee for the 2018 U.S. House of Representatives election in Tennessee's 7th congressional district after running unopposed for the nomination. His State Senate district included much of the northern part of the congressional district. Green won the general election in November and took office in January 2019.

2020 

In the 2020 Republican primary, Green was unopposed. On November 3, he defeated Democratic nominee Kiran Sreepada and two independents with 69.9% of the vote.

2022 

In the 2022 Republican primary, Green was unopposed. On November 8, he defeated Democratic nominee Odessa Kelly with 60.0% of the vote.

Tenure
After incumbent U.S. Senator Lamar Alexander announced he would not seek reelection in 2020, Green was considered a likely candidate for the seat. But on July 11, 2019, he announced that he would not be a candidate.

In late February 2021, Green and a dozen other Republican House members skipped votes and enlisted others to vote for them, citing the ongoing COVID-19 pandemic. But he and the other members were actually attending the Conservative Political Action Conference, which was held at the same time as their slated absences. In response, the Campaign for Accountability, an ethics watchdog group, filed a complaint with the House Committee on Ethics and requested an investigation into Green and the other lawmakers.

Committee assignments
Committee on Homeland Security (Chairman)
Committee on Foreign Affairs
Subcommittee on Indo-Pacific
Subcommittee on Western Hemisphere

Caucus memberships
Freedom Caucus
Republican Study Committee
Special Operations Forces Caucus
GOP Doctor's Caucus
Pro-Life Caucus
Prayer Caucus
Military Family Caucus
Military Veterans Caucus
Congressional Army Caucus
House Republican Israel Caucus
Songwriters Caucus
Values Action Team
Congressional Recording Arts and Sciences Caucus

Political positions

Abortion
Green opposes abortion. In a 2019 op-ed, he wrote, "modern science has revealed that mother and baby are, in fact, two separate persons—long before the baby is born" and argued that "a child becomes a child at conception".

Climate change
Green rejects the scientific consensus that human activity plays a key role in climate change.

Creationism 
Green rejects the theory of evolution, which is consensus in biology; in a 2015 lecture he used creationist reasoning such as "irreducible complexity".

2020 Election 
In December 2019, Green voted against the articles of impeachment in the first impeachment of Donald Trump.

In December 2020, Green was one of 126 Republican members of the House of Representatives to sign an amicus brief in support of Texas v. Pennsylvania, a lawsuit filed at the United States Supreme Court contesting the results of the 2020 presidential election, in which Joe Biden prevailed over incumbent Donald Trump. The Supreme Court declined to hear the case on the basis that Texas lacked standing under Article III of the Constitution to challenge the results of an election held by another state.

Vaccines 
In 2018, as a congressman-elect, Green said at a constituent meeting, "there is some concern that the rise in autism is the result of the preservatives that are in our vaccines", a claim that has been repeatedly debunked by scientific studies and rejected by medical organizations such as the American Academy of Pediatrics.

Personal life
Green and his wife, Camie, have two children. For most of his tenure in the state senate, he lived in Ashland City, in Cheatham County, south of Clarksville and west of Nashville. He has since moved to Clarksville.

Bibliography

Electoral history

References

External links
 Congressman Mark E. Green official U.S. House website
Mark E. Green for Congress 

|-

|-

1964 births
21st-century American politicians
United States Army personnel of the War in Afghanistan (2001–2021)
United States Army personnel of the Iraq War
American Christian creationists
Living people
People from Ashland City, Tennessee
People from Clarksville, Tennessee
Republican Party members of the United States House of Representatives from Tennessee
Republican Party Tennessee state senators
United States Army Medical Corps officers
United States Military Academy alumni
University of Southern California alumni
Wright State University alumni
Writers from Tennessee
Physicians from Tennessee